Cornelis Roelans van Mechelen (1450-1525) (also Cornelius Roelans Mechelingensis de Mechlinea, Cornelius de Mechelingensis, or Roelants van Mechelen) was a Flemish physician and paediatrician of the late Middle Ages.

References

1450 births
1525 deaths
Physicians of the Habsburg Netherlands
Scientists of the Habsburg Netherlands
Physicians from Mechelen
Old University of Leuven alumni